Daniel Bakongolia (born 3 March 1987) is a Congolese former footballer who played as a striker.

References

1987 births
Living people
Footballers from Kinshasa
Democratic Republic of the Congo footballers
Democratic Republic of the Congo international footballers
AS Vita Club players
SM Sanga Balende players
TP Mazembe players
FC ViOn Zlaté Moravce players
1. FK Příbram players
C.R. Caála players
Daring Club Motema Pembe players
Association football forwards
Slovak Super Liga players
Democratic Republic of the Congo expatriate footballers
Expatriate footballers in Hungary
Democratic Republic of the Congo expatriate sportspeople in Hungary
Expatriate footballers in the Czech Republic
Democratic Republic of the Congo expatriate sportspeople in the Czech Republic
Expatriate footballers in Slovakia
Democratic Republic of the Congo expatriate sportspeople in Slovakia
Expatriate footballers in Angola
Democratic Republic of the Congo expatriate sportspeople in Angola
21st-century Democratic Republic of the Congo people